Nicos Timotheou (born November 4, 1973) is a Cypriot former international football defender.

He played mostly for APOEL, where he stayed for 9 years and won 1 Championship, 5 Cups and 3 Super Cups.

He also played for Omonia Aradippou, Alki Larnaca and had 11 participations with Cyprus national football team.

External links
 

1973 births
Living people
Cypriot footballers
Cyprus international footballers
Greek Cypriot people
Association football defenders
APOEL FC players
Alki Larnaca FC players
Sportspeople from Nicosia